The Buffalo Gap Historic Commercial District, is a historic district in Buffalo Gap, South Dakota, United States, that is listed on the National Register of Historic Places (NRHP).

Description

It includes Late 19th and Early 20th Century American Movements architecture.

It includes roughly the area surrounding Main, 2nd, and Walnut Streets.

It was added to the NRHP on June 30, 1995.

See also

 National Register of Historic Places listings in Custer County, South Dakota

References

External links

National Register of Historic Places in Custer County, South Dakota
Historic districts on the National Register of Historic Places in South Dakota
Late 19th and Early 20th Century American Movements architecture
Buildings and structures completed in 1886